The Sarteano Annunciation is an oil on canvas painting by Domenico Beccafumi, executed c. 1546. It is located in the church of San Martino in Foro in Sarteano, Italy.

The painting is about the Annunciation, an event in Christian theology. The angel Gabriel visits the Virgin Mary to tell her that she will be the mother of Jesus Christ.

One of the painter's last works, it is recorded in a 1548 document as being produced for a man named Gabriello di Sarteano. The document also mentioned that it had been commissioned around 1545 and that it had "more figures", possibly on a now-lost predella. Two years after the commission the painter complained to the governors of Siena that he had still not been paid for the work.

References

Paintings in Tuscany
Paintings by Domenico Beccafumi
1546 paintings
Paintings depicting the Annunciation